Little Things or The Little Thing or variation, may refer to:

Music

Albums
 Little Things (Sylver album), 2003
 Little Things (Toby Lightman album), 2004
 Little Things (Jeannie Seely album), 1968
 Little Things, a 2004 album by Hanne Hukkelberg
 Little Things, a 2011 album from C418 discography

Songs
 "Little Things" (ABBA song), 2021
 "Little Things" (Bobby Goldsboro song), 1964
 "Little Things" (Bush song), 1995
 "Little Things" (Good Charlotte song), 2001
 "Little Things" (India Arie song), 2002
 "Little Things" (Jessica Mauboy song), 2019
 "Little Things" (Marty Stuart song), 1991
 "Little Things" (One Direction song), 2012
 "Little Things" (Tanya Tucker song), 1997
 "Little Things" (The Oak Ridge Boys song), 1985
 "Little Things", by Big Thief, 2021
 "Little Things", by Jeannie Seely, 1968; off the album Little Things (Jeannie Seely album)
 "Little Things", by Sylver, 2003; off the album Little Things (Sylver album)
 "Little Things", by Ziggy Ramo and Paul Kelly, 2021

 "Little Thing", by Toby Lightman, 2004; off the album Little Things (Toby Lightman album)
 "The Little Things" (song), a 2008 song by Colbie Caillat

Film
 Little Things (film), 2014
 The Little Things (2021 film), a crime thriller film by John Lee Hancock
 The Little Things (2010 film), an Australian indie film
 The Little Thing (1938 film), a French drama film
 The Little Thing (1923 film), a French silent film

Literature
 Little Things (novel), a 2002 novel in the Buffy the Vampire Slayer series
 "Little Things" (poem), a 1845 poem by Julia Abigail Fletcher Carney
 "Little Things" (short story), a short story by Raymond Carver

Other uses
 LittleThings, a digital media firm
 Little Things (video game), a 2010 iOS game by KLICKTOCK
 Little Things (TV series), a 2016 Indian Netflix series

See also

 
 
 
 
 "All of the Little Things", a 2021 song by Winston Surfshirt featuring Ramirez
 "Littlest Things", a 2006 song by Lily Allen
 "Dirty Little Thing", a 2004 Velvet Revolver song off the album Contraband
 Pretty Little Thing (disambiguation)